Maharashtra State Financial Corporation (MSFC) is the term lending development financial institution in  Maharashtra state in India.  It provides finance to small and medium scale enterprises. It was set up by Government of Maharashtra in 1962.

References

State agencies of Maharashtra
Economy of Maharashtra
State financial corporations of India
Financial services companies based in Mumbai
Indian companies established in 1962
1962 establishments in Maharashtra
Government agencies established in 1962